2023 Asaph, provisional designation , is a dark asteroid from the outer regions of the asteroid belt, approximately 21 kilometers in diameter. It was discovered on 16 September 1952, by astronomers of the Indiana Asteroid Program at Goethe Link Observatory in Indiana, United States.

Orbit and classification 

Asaph orbits the Sun in the outer main-belt at a distance of 2.1–3.7 AU once every 4 years and 11 months (1,781 days). Its orbit has an eccentricity of 0.28 and an inclination of 22° with respect to the ecliptic. The asteroid's observation arc begins with its official discovery observation Goethe Link.

Physical characterization 

In November 2001, a rotational lightcurve of Asaph was obtained from photometric observations by American astronomer Brian Warner. Lightcurve analysis gave a rotation period of 4.74 hours with a low brightness variation of 0.06 magnitude. These observations supersede a period of 9.19 hours derived from two fragmentary lightcurves obtained in 2001 and 2006, respectively.

Diameter and albedo 

According to the surveys carried out by the Japanese Akari satellite and the NEOWISE mission of NASA's Wide-field Infrared Survey Explorer, Asaph measures between 19.678 and 21.29 kilometers in diameter and its surface has an albedo between 0.09 and 0.1045.

The Collaborative Asteroid Lightcurve Link assumes a standard albedo for carbonaceous asteroids of 0.057 and consequently calculates a larger diameter of 25.44 kilometers based on an absolute magnitude of 11.7.

Naming 

This minor planet was named in memory of American astronomer Asaph Hall (1829–1907), who discovered the Martian satellites, Phobos and Deimos. The official  was published by the Minor Planet Center on 15 October 1977.

Notes

References

External links 
 Asteroid Lightcurve Database (LCDB), query form (info )
 Dictionary of Minor Planet Names, Google books
 Asteroids and comets rotation curves, CdR – Observatoire de Genève, Raoul Behrend
 Discovery Circumstances: Numbered Minor Planets (1)-(5000) – Minor Planet Center
 
 

002023
002023
Named minor planets
19520916